Coesse Corners is an unincorporated community in Union Township, Whitley County, in the U.S. state of Indiana.

Geography

References

Unincorporated communities in Whitley County, Indiana
Unincorporated communities in Indiana